Karmiya is a small village of the Basti district, Uttar Pradesh, India.

Demography
 total number of families residing in this village were 47 and its total population was 251.

References

Villages in Basti district